Vania King and Jelena Kostanić were the defending champions. They were both present but did not compete together.
Kostanic partnered with Jill Craybas, but lost in the first round to Camille Pin and María Emilia Salerni.
King partnered with Chia-jung Chuang, but Sun Tiantian and Yan Zi defeated them 1–6, 6–2, 10–6, in the final.

Seeds

Draw

External links
Draw

Women's Doubles